George Robert Lapslie (born 5 September 1997) is an English professional footballer who plays as a midfielder for Gillingham of League Two.

Career

Charlton Athletic
Lapslie first joined Charlton Athletic in 2009 and quickly progressed through the youth ranks. Lapslie appeared on the bench during Charlton's EFL Trophy tie against Colchester United in November 2016, however, he failed to feature in their 1–1 draw. On 29 August 2017, Lapslie scored on his professional debut against Crawley Town in an EFL Trophy tie.

Chelmsford City (loan)
On 2 February 2018, Lapslie signed for Chelmsford City on a one-month loan. Lapslie returned to Charlton at the start of March having not made any appearances for Chelmsford.

Mansfield Town
On 15 October 2020, Lapslie joined Mansfield Town on a season-long loan.

On 19 January 2021, Lapslie's loan move to Mansfield Town was made permanent for an undisclosed fee.

On 4 December 2021, Lapslie scored two goals away at Doncaster Rovers to send Mansfield into the third round of the FA Cup as Mansfield knocked Doncaster out 3–2.

Gillingham
On 14 January 2023, Lapslie signed for EFL League Two side Gillingham.

Personal life
His older brother Tom Lapslie is also a professional footballer who plays for Torquay United. George attended St Martins school in Brentwood, Essex where he showed his talent helping them to a National Cup Semi-Final.

Career statistics

Honours
Charlton Athletic
EFL League One play-offs: 2019

Individual
Charlton Athletic Young Player of the Year: 2018–19

References

External links

1997 births
Living people
People from the London Borough of Waltham Forest
English footballers
Association football midfielders
Charlton Athletic F.C. players
Chelmsford City F.C. players
Mansfield Town F.C. players
Gillingham F.C. players
English Football League players